63rd is a station on the Chicago Transit Authority's 'L' system, serving the Red Line. The station is located in the median of the Dan Ryan Expressway and serves the Englewood neighborhood. It is near the former site of the Englewood Union Station, which served the Pennsylvania Railroad, New York Central, and Rock Island Lines. The former Pennsylvania Railroad tracks (now NS owned) pass over the station. Also visible from the station is the Ashland branch of the Green Line which runs on an elevated structure immediately west of the expressway at the location before turning west on 63rd Street.

History

Structure
Like the eight other stations of the Dan Ryan Branch, 63rd was built by architect Skidmore, Owings & Merrill under a simple design. The station opened on September 28, 1969, before being entirely renovated from 2005 to 2006.

2013 renovation
In 2013, the station was renovated with a new elevator installed (along with Garfield and 87th) as part of the Red Line South Reconstruction project and made all the stations on the Dan Ryan branch accessible.

Bus connections
CTA
  24 Wentworth (Weekdays only) 
  63 63rd (Owl Service)

Notes and references

Notes

References

External links 

 Train schedule (PDF) at CTA official site
 63rd/Dan Ryan Station Page at Chicago-L.org
63rd/Dan Ryan Station Page CTA official site
63rd Street entrance from Google Maps Street View

CTA Red Line stations
Railway stations in the United States opened in 1969
Railway stations in Chicago